Étréchy is a commune in the Essonne department in Île-de-France in northern France.

Geography
The village lies on the left bank of the river Juine, which forms all of the commune's eastern border.

Population
Inhabitants of Étréchy are known as Strépiniacois in French.

See also
Communes of the Essonne department

References

External links

Mayors of Essonne Association 

Communes of Essonne